The St. Louis–San Francisco class 4500 was a class of 25 4-8-4 "Northern" type steam locomotives built by the Baldwin Locomotive Works between 1942-1943 and operated by the St. Louis–San Francisco Railway.

The first three operated in passenger service, pulling trains such as the Meteor. The rest pulled freight throughout the system until retirement by the early 1950s. Four 4500s has been preserved and all are on display.

History
The first three (Nos 4500–4502) were built as an oil-burning steam locomotives in 1942 for Frisco passenger service. They were was painted in the zephyr blue, white and gray paint scheme with "Meteor" spelled out on the side of the tender in bold, red letters. They were used for pulling Frisco's crack Meteor train service. They also saw service pulling Frisco's Texas Special.  When the Meteor was dieselized, the locomotives were re-painted into Frisco's standard black with gold striping and lettering, and assigned to passenger trains such as the Will Rogers. The latter twelve (Nos. 4503–4514) were also built in 1942, but as coal burners and pulled fast freight throughout the Frisco system. The last ten (Nos. 4515–4524) were built in 1943 as coal burners and also pulled freight. Despite the latter 22 being intended for freight service, they have also pulled passenger trains on occasion. Some of the earlier locomotives were equipped with boosters. In 1948, Frisco 4501 still in its Meteor livery pulled President Harry S. Truman's whistle stop tour train through his home state of Missouri. Their design was also similar to the Chicago, Burlington and Quincy Railroad's O-5 class of Northerns, though there were some differences.

As the Frisco was dieselising, the locomotives was assigned to secondary passenger trains such as the General Wood and all were out of operation and put into storage by 1952.

Preservation
Four 4500s survived into preservation:

 4500 is on display for free public viewing at the Route 66 Historical Village at 3770 Southwest Blvd. in Tulsa, Oklahoma. 
 4501 is on display at the Museum of the American Railroad in Frisco, Texas.
 4516 is on display at Missouri State Fair Grounds in Sedalia, Missouri.
 4524 is on display at Grant Beach Park in Springfield, Missouri.

Roster

References

4500
4-8-4 locomotives
Baldwin locomotives
Preserved steam locomotives of the United States
Standard gauge locomotives of the United States
Railway locomotives introduced in 1942